Overwrite or overwriting can refer to:
Overwriting (prose), a writing style of needlessly over-elaborating a point
Overwriting (cognitive memory), a type of interference with memory
Data erasure

See also
 Overstrike
 Overtype